The antitragus is a feature of mammalian ear anatomy.

In humans, it is a small tubercle on the visible part of the ear, the pinna. The antitragus is located just above the earlobe and points anteriorly. It is separated from the tragus by the intertragic notch.

The antitragicus muscle, an intrinsic muscle of the ear, arises from the outer part of the antitragus.

The antitragus can be much larger in some other species, most notably bats.

The antitragus is sometimes pierced.

Additional images

See also
 Antitragus piercing

References

External links
 
  (#6)
 Diagram at bodymodforums.com

Ear
Human body